Nordefjorden is a fjord on the west side of the island of Seiland in Hammerfest Municipality, Troms og Finnmark county, Norway. The fjord extends about  southeastwards to the Nordre Bumannsfjorddalen valley at the bottom of the fjord. Because of the valley, the fjord is occasionally called Nordre Bumannsfjord. The fjord has no coastal settlements. The Sørefjorden lies a little further south.

References

Fjords of Troms og Finnmark
Hammerfest